In mathematics, a quintic threefold is a  3-dimensional hypersurface of degree 5 in 4-dimensional projective space . Non-singular quintic threefolds are Calabi–Yau manifolds.

The Hodge diamond of a non-singular quintic 3-fold is

Mathematician Robbert Dijkgraaf said "One number which every algebraic geometer knows is the number 2,875 because obviously, that is the number of lines on a quintic."

Definition 
As a set, a Calabi-Yau manifold iswhere  is a degree  homogeneous polynomial. One of the most studied examples is from the polynomialcalled a Fermat polynomial. Proving that such a polynomial defines a Calabi-Yau requires some more tools, like the Adjunction formula and conditions for smoothness.

Hypersurfaces in P4 
Then, using the Adjunction formula to compute its canonical bundle, we havehence in order for the variety to be Calabi-Yau, meaning it has a trivial canonical bundle, its degree must be . It is then a Calabi-Yau manifold if in addition this variety is smooth. This can be checked by looking at the zeros of the polynomialsand making sure the setis empty.

Examples

Fermat Quintic 

As a Hodge Conjecture testbed 
Another application of the quintic threefold is in the study of the infinitesimal generalized Hodge conjecture where this difficult problem can be solved in this case. In fact, all of the lines on this hypersurface can be found explicitly.

Dwork family of quintic three-folds 
Another popular class of examples of quintic three-folds, studied in many contexts, is the Dwork family. One popular study of such a family is from Candelas, De La Ossa, Green, and Parkes, when they discovered mirror symmetry. This is given by the family pages 123-125where  is a single parameter not equal to a 5-th root of unity. The partial derivates are given byAt a point where the partial derivatives are all zero, this gives the relation .

Other examples 

 Barth–Nieto quintic
 Consani–Scholten quintic

Curves on a quintic threefold 
Computing the number of rational curves of degree  can be computed explicitly using Schubert calculus. Let  be the rank  vector bundle on the Grassmannian  of -planes in some rank  vector space. Its total chern class isin the Chow ring . Then, in order to calculate the number of lines on a generic quintic threefold, it suffices to compute the integralThis can be done by using the splitting principle.

Rational curves
 conjectured that the number of rational curves of a given degree on a generic quintic threefold is finite. (Some smooth but non-generic quintic threefolds have infinite families of lines on them.) This was verified for degrees up to 7 by  who also calculated the number 609250 of degree 2 rational curves. 

The number of rational curves of various degrees on a generic quintic threefold is given by 
2875, 609250, 317206375, 242467530000, ....
Since the generic quintic threefold is a Calabi–Yau threefold and the moduli space of rational curves of a given degree is a discrete, finite set (hence compact), these have well-defined Donaldson–Thomas invariants (the "virtual number of points"); at least for degree 1 and 2, these agree with the actual number of points.

See also 

 Mirror symmetry (string theory)
 Gromov–Witten invariant
 Jacobian ideal - gives an explicit basis for the Hodge-decomposition
 Deformation theory
 Hodge structure
Schubert calculus - techniques for determining the number of lines on a quintic threefold

References

Algebraic varieties
3-folds
Complex manifolds